The Curse of the Werewolf is a 1961 British horror film based on the novel The Werewolf of Paris by Guy Endore. The film was made by the British company Hammer Film Productions and was shot at Bray Studios on sets that were constructed for the proposed Spanish inquisition themed The Rape of Sabena, a film that was shelved when the BBFC objected to the script. While the original story took place in Paris, the location of the film was moved to Madrid to avoid building new Parisian sets. The leading part of the werewolf was Oliver Reed's first starring role in a film and composer Benjamin Frankel's score is notable for its use of twelve-tone serialism, rare in film music. It was also the first werewolf film to be shot in color.

It was released in May 1961 on a double feature bill with Shadow of the Cat, another Hammer film. Upon its initial release, the film was heavily censored in the UK, and a restored print was first aired on the BBC in 1993. While a premiere TV screening of the restored print had been planned to air on BBC2 on 31 October 1992, during the Vault of Horror all-night marathon hosted by Dr. Walpurgis (played by Guy Henry; later named Dr. Terror), the censored version was aired by mistake.

Plot
A beggar in 18th-century Spain is imprisoned by a cruel marqués after making inappropriate remarks at the nobleman's wedding feast. The beggar is forgotten, and survives another fifteen years. His sole human contact is with the jailer and his beautiful, mute daughter. The aging, decrepit marqués makes advances on the jailer's daughter while she is cleaning his room. When she refuses him, the marqués has her thrown into the dungeon with the beggar. The beggar, driven mad by his long confinement, rapes her and then dies.

The girl is released the next day and sent to "entertain" the marqués. She kills the old man and flees. She is found in the forest by the kindly gentleman-scholar Don Alfredo Corledo, who lives alone with his housekeeper Teresa. The warm and motherly Teresa soon nurses the girl back to health; however, the girl dies after giving birth to a baby on Christmas Day, a fact that Teresa considers "unlucky".

Alfredo and Teresa raise the boy, whom they name Leon. Leon, cursed by the evil circumstances of his conception and by his Christmas Day birth, is soon revealed to be a werewolf. An early hunting incident gives him a taste for blood, which he struggles to overcome. Soon, a number of goats are found dead, and a herder's dog is blamed.

Thirteen years later, Leon leaves home to seek work at the Gomez vineyard. The vintner, Don Fernando, sets Leon to work in the wine cellar with Jose Amadeo, who becomes Leon's friend. Leon falls in love with Fernando's daughter, Cristina, and becomes despondent at the seeming impossibility of marrying her. He allows Jose to take him to a nearby brothel, where he transforms and kills Vera, one of the girls. He also kills Jose, before returning to Alfredo's house. Too late, he learns that Cristina's loving presence prevents his transformation; he is about to run away with her when he is arrested and jailed on suspicion of murder. He begs to be executed before he changes again, but the mayor does not believe him. His wolf nature rising to the surface, he breaks out of his cell, killing an old soak and the gaoler. Shocked and disgusted by his appearance, the local people summon his adoptive father, who has obtained a silver bullet made from a crucifix blessed by an archbishop. Though torn with grief, Alfredo shoots Leon dead, and tearfully covers his body with a cloak.

Cast

 Clifford Evans as Don Alfredo Corledo
 Oliver Reed as Leon Corledo
 Justin Walters as Young Leon Corledo
 Yvonne Romain as Servant girl
 Loraine Carvana as Young Servant girl
 Catherine Feller as Christina Fernando
 Anthony Dawson as Marques Siniestro
 Josephine Llewelyn as Marquesa Siniestro
 Richard Wordsworth as Beggar
 Hira Talfrey as Teresa
 John Gabriel as Priest
 Warren Mitchell as Pepe Valiente
 Anne Blake as Rosa Valiente
 George Woodbridge as Dominique the goat herder
 Michael Ripper as Old Soak
 Ewen Solon as Don Fernando
 Peter Sallis as Don Enrique 
 Martin Matthews as Jose Amadayo
 David Conville as Rico Gomez
 Denis Shaw as Gaoler
 Sheila Brennan as Vera
 Joy Webster as Isabel
 Renny Lister as Yvonne
 Charles Lamb as Marques' Chef
 Desmond Llewelyn (uncredited) as Marques's footman

Production

Filming occurred at Bray Studios in Berkshire.

Reception
The film was not as successful as Hammer's previous horror films like Frankenstein, Dracula, and The Mummy. Howard Thompson of The New York Times wrote that some of the color photography was "beautiful," adding that "for a werewolf yarn this Hammer Production has a Gothic type of narrative that is not uninteresting, if broadly acted." Harrison's Reports graded the film as "Good," finding the production values "a big asset" although the review felt there was "not enough action." Variety called it "an outstanding entry of the horror picture genre. Although not a particularly frightening or novel story treatment of the perennial shock film topic (werewolves ranking second only to vampires in cinema), it is a first-class effort in other respects." The Monthly Film Bulletin wrote, "Even by Hammer standards, this is a singularly repellent job of slaughter-house horror... Surely the time has come when a film like this should be turned over to the alienists for comment; as entertainment its stolid acting, writing, presentation and direction could hardly be more preclusive."

Home video release
In North America, the film was released on 6 September 2005 along with seven other Hammer horror films on the 4-DVD set The Hammer Horror Series (ASIN: B0009X770O), which is part of MCA-Universal's Franchise Collection. This set was re-released on Blu-ray on 13 September 2016. The film received an individual release with a new 4K scan in April 2020. The new release included a new commentary track by Steven Haberman, a featurette the on the making of the film, make up artist Roy Ashton, "Lycanthrophy: The Beast in All of Us" and stills from the film.  Furthermore, in some versions of the video, the mute girl's father is the beggar, himself.

Comic
The film was adapted into a 15-page comic strip for the January 1978 issue of the magazine The House of Hammer (volume 1, # 10, published by General Book Distribution).  It was drawn by John Bolton from a script by Steve Moore.  The cover of the issue featured a painting by Brian Lewis as Leon in human and werewolf forms.

In popular culture
Many of the characters in Joe Dante's 1981 werewolf movie The Howling are named after the directors of werewolf films. Belinda Balaski's character "Terri Fisher" is named for Terence Fisher, who directed The Curse of the Werewolf.

The Curse of the Werewolf is also referred to obliquely in John Landis's 1981 werewolf movie An American Werewolf in London when David Kessler (David Naughton) asks Alex Price (Jenny Agutter) "Did you ever see The Wolf Man?" and Alex replies, "Is that the one with Oliver Reed?"

References

External links

 
 
 
 
 

1961 films
1961 horror films
1960s fantasy films
British fantasy films
British werewolf films
Films about curses
Films adapted into comics
Films based on American horror novels
Films directed by Terence Fisher
Films scored by Benjamin Frankel
Films set in castles
Films set in Spain
Films set in the 18th century
Films set in the 19th century
Films shot at Bray Studios
Hammer Film Productions horror films
Universal Pictures films
1960s English-language films
1960s British films